The Ridge Meadows Flames are a Junior "B" ice hockey team based in Maple Ridge, British Columbia, Canada. They are members of the Harold Brittain Conference of the Pacific Junior Hockey League (PJHL). The Flames play their home games at Planet Ice Maple Ridge. Blaine Hallman is the director of Hockey Operations. Derek Bedard serves as the team's General Manager and Governor.  Former NHL player, Brent Hughes is the Head Coach. Mike Legg, Brett Sonne and Bobby Vermette serve as the Assistant Coaches.  Mackenzie Skapski and Jeff Smith are the Goalie Coaches.

The team was founded in 1972 in North Shore, British Columbia as the North Shore Winter Club Flames until relocating to Maple Ridge in 1993. In its history, the team has won the Keystone Cup once, in 1998. The Flames have won the Cyclone Taylor Cup three times in 1983, 1996 and 1998. They won the NIL Championship once, in 1974; the WCJHL Championship once, in 1983; and the PIJHL Championship twice, in 1996 and 1998.

History

The Ridge Meadows Flames were originally named the North Shore Winter Club Flames in 1972 and joined the North Island League (NIL) for the 1973–74 season, where they won their first ever championship. The following season, the Flames joined the West Coast Junior Hockey League (WCJHL). In the 1981-82 WCJHL season, the Flames lost in the WCJHL Finals, 3 games to 0 to the Seattle North West Americans. In the 1982-83 WCJHL season, the Flames won the 1982-83 WCJHL championship, and the 1982-83 Cyclone Taylor Cup. In 1993 the Flames relocated from North Shore, British Columbia to Maple Ridge, British Columbia. In the 1995–96 season, the Flames defeated the Richmond Sockeyes, who they finished second to in the regular season, to take the PIJHL Championship. Two years later, the Flames won the 1998 PIJHL Championship, then went on to win the Keystone Cup in Winnipeg, Manitoba.

Season-by-season record

Note: GP = Games played, W = Wins, L = Losses, T = Ties, OTL = Overtime Losses, Pts = Points, GF = Goals for, GA = Goals against

NHL alumni

Kellan Tochkin
Mackenzie Skapski
Brad Hunt
Brandon Yip

Awards and trophies

Keystone Cup
1997-98

Cyclone Taylor Cup
1982-83, 1995–96, 1997–98

NIL Championship
1973-74

PIJHL Championship
1995-96, 1997–98

WCJHL Championship
1982-83

Coach of the Year
Tavis Eaton: 2009-10
Bayne Ryshak: 2017-18

Most Improved Player
Shane Harle: 2009-10
Ryley Lanthier: 2017-18

External links
Official website of the Ridge Meadows Flames

Pacific Junior Hockey League teams
Ice hockey teams in British Columbia
Ice hockey clubs established in 1972
1972 establishments in British Columbia
Maple Ridge, British Columbia